Rodents (from Latin , 'to gnaw') are mammals of the order Rodentia, which are characterized by a single pair of continuously growing incisors in each of the upper and lower jaws. About 40% of all mammal species are rodents. They are native to all major land masses except for New Zealand, Antarctica, and several oceanic islands, though they have subsequently been introduced to most of these land masses by human activity.

Rodents are extremely diverse in their ecology and lifestyles and can be found in almost every terrestrial habitat, including human-made environments. Species can be arboreal, fossorial (burrowing), saltatorial/richochetal (leaping on their hind legs), or semiaquatic. However, all rodents share several morphological features, including having only a single upper and lower pair of ever-growing incisors. Well-known rodents include mice, rats, squirrels, prairie dogs, porcupines, beavers, guinea pigs, and hamsters. Rabbits, hares, and pikas, whose incisors also grow continually (but have two pairs of upper incisors instead of one), were once included with them, but are now considered to be in a separate order, the Lagomorpha. Nonetheless, Rodentia and Lagomorpha are sister groups, sharing a single common ancestor and forming the clade of Glires.

Most rodents are small animals with robust bodies, short limbs, and long tails. They use their sharp incisors to gnaw food, excavate burrows, and defend themselves. Most eat seeds or other plant material, but some have more varied diets. They tend to be social animals and many species live in societies with complex ways of communicating with each other. Mating among rodents can vary from monogamy, to polygyny, to promiscuity. Many have litters of underdeveloped, altricial young, while others are precocial (relatively well developed) at birth.

The rodent fossil record dates back to the Paleocene on the supercontinent of Laurasia. Rodents greatly diversified in the Eocene, as they spread across continents, sometimes even crossing oceans. Rodents reached both South America and Madagascar from Africa and, until the arrival of Homo sapiens, were the only terrestrial placental mammals to reach and colonize Australia.

Rodents have been used as food, for clothing, as pets, and as laboratory animals in research. Some species, in particular, the brown rat, the black rat, and the house mouse, are serious pests, eating and spoiling food stored by humans and spreading diseases. Accidentally introduced species of rodents are often considered to be invasive and have caused the extinction of numerous species, such as island birds, the dodo being an example, previously isolated from land-based predators.

Characteristics 

The distinguishing feature of the rodents is their pairs of continuously growing, razor-sharp, open-rooted incisors. These incisors have thick layers of enamel on the front and little enamel on the back. Because they do not stop growing, the animal must continue to wear them down so that they do not reach and pierce the skull. As the incisors grind against each other, the softer dentine on the rear of the teeth wears away, leaving the sharp enamel edge shaped like the blade of a chisel. Most species have up to 22 teeth with no canines or anterior premolars. A gap, or diastema, occurs between the incisors and the cheek teeth in most species. This allows rodents to suck in their cheeks or lips to shield their mouth and throat from wood shavings and other inedible material, discarding this waste from the sides of their mouths. Chinchillas and guinea pigs have a high-fiber diet; their molars have no roots and grow continuously like their incisors.

In many species, the molars are relatively large, intricately structured, and highly cusped or ridged. Rodent molars are well equipped to grind food into small particles. The jaw musculature is strong. The lower jaw is thrust forward while gnawing and is pulled backwards during chewing. Gnawing uses incisors and chewing uses molars, however, due to the cranial anatomy of rodents these feeding methods cannot be used at the same time and are considered to be mutually exclusive. Among rodents, the masseter muscles plays a key role in chewing, making up 60% - 80% of the total muscle mass among masticatory muscles and reflects rodents herbivorous diet. Rodent groups differ in the arrangement of the jaw muscles and associated skull structures, both from other mammals and amongst themselves. The Sciuromorpha, such as the eastern grey squirrel, have a large deep masseter, making them efficient at biting with the incisors. The Myomorpha, such as the brown rat, have enlarged temporalis and masseter muscles, making them able to chew powerfully with their molars. In rodents, masseter muscles insert behind the eyes and contribute to eye boggling that occurs during gnawing where the quick contraction and relaxation of the muscle causes the eyeballs to move up and down. The Hystricomorpha, such as the guinea pig, have larger superficial masseter muscles and smaller deep masseter muscles than rats or squirrels, possibly making them less efficient at biting with the incisors, but their enlarged internal pterygoid muscles may allow them to move the jaw further sideways when chewing. The cheek pouch is a specific morphological feature used for storing food and is evident in particular subgroups of rodents like kangaroo rats, hamsters, chipmunks and gophers which have two bags that may range from the mouth to the front of the shoulders. True mice and rats do not contain this structure but their cheeks are elastic due to a high degree of musculature and innervation in the region.

Rodents have wide-ranging morphologies, but typically have squat bodies and short limbs. The fore limbs usually have five digits, including an opposable thumb, while the hind limbs have three to five digits. The elbow gives the forearms great flexibility. The majority of species are plantigrade, walking on both the palms and soles of their feet, and have claw-like nails. The nails of burrowing species tend to be long and strong, while arboreal rodents have shorter, sharper nails. Rodent species use a wide variety of methods of locomotion including quadrupedal walking, running, burrowing, climbing, bipedal hopping (kangaroo rats and hopping mice), swimming and even gliding.
Scaly-tailed squirrels and flying squirrels, although not closely related, can both glide from tree to tree using parachute-like membranes that stretch from the fore to the hind limbs. The agouti is fleet-footed and antelope-like, being digitigrade and having hoof-like nails. The majority of rodents have tails, which can be of many shapes and sizes. Some tails are prehensile, as in the Eurasian harvest mouse, and the fur on the tails can vary from bushy to completely bald. The tail is sometimes used for communication, as when beavers slap their tails on the water surface or house mice rattle their tails to indicate alarm. Some species have vestigial tails or no tails at all. In some species, the tail is capable of regeneration if a part is broken off.

Rodents generally have well-developed senses of smell, hearing, and vision. Nocturnal species often have enlarged eyes and some are sensitive to ultraviolet light. Many species have long, sensitive whiskers or vibrissae for touch or "whisking". Whisker action is mostly driven by the brain stem, which is itself provoked by the cortex. However Legg et al. 1989 find an alternate circuit between the cortex and whiskers through the cerebellar circuits, and Hemelt & Keller 2008 the superior colliculus. Some rodents have cheek pouches, which may be lined with fur. These can be turned inside out for cleaning. In many species, the tongue cannot reach past the incisors. Rodents have efficient digestive systems, absorbing nearly 80% of ingested energy. When eating cellulose, the food is softened in the stomach and passed to the cecum, where bacteria reduce it to its carbohydrate elements. The rodent then practices coprophagy, eating its own fecal pellets, so the nutrients can be absorbed by the gut. Rodents therefore often produce a hard and dry fecal pellet. Horn et al. 2013 makes the finding that rodents entirely lack the ability to vomit. In many species, the penis contains a bone, the baculum; the testes can be located either abdominally or at the groin. 

Sexual dimorphism occurs in many rodent species. In some rodents, males are larger than females, while in others the reverse is true. Male-bias sexual dimorphism is typical for ground squirrels, kangaroo rats, solitary mole rats and pocket gophers; it likely developed due to sexual selection and greater male-male combat. Female-bias sexual dimorphism exists among chipmunks and jumping mice. It is not understood why this pattern occurs, but in the case of yellow-pine chipmunks, males may have selected larger females due to their greater reproductive success. In some species, such as voles, sexual dimorphism can vary from population to population. In bank voles, females are typically larger than males, but male-bias sexual dimorphism occurs in alpine populations, possibly because of the lack of predators and greater competition between males.

Distribution and habitat

One of the most widespread groups of mammals, rodents can be found on every continent except Antarctica. They are the only terrestrial placental mammals to have colonized Australia and New Guinea without human intervention. Humans have also allowed the animals to spread to many remote oceanic islands (e.g., the Polynesian rat). Rodents have adapted to almost every terrestrial habitat, from cold tundra (where they can live under snow) to hot deserts.

Some species such as tree squirrels and New World porcupines are arboreal, while some, such as gophers, tuco-tucos, and mole rats, live almost completely underground, where they build complex burrow systems. Others dwell on the surface of the ground, but may have a burrow into which they can retreat. Beavers and muskrats are known for being semiaquatic, but the rodent best-adapted for aquatic life is probably the earless water rat from New Guinea. Rodents have also thrived in human-created environments such as agricultural and urban areas.

Though some species are common pests for humans, rodents also play important ecological roles. Some rodents are considered keystone species and ecosystem engineers in their respective habitats. In the Great Plains of North America, the burrowing activities of prairie dogs play important roles in soil aeration and nutrient redistribution, raising the organic content of the soil and increasing the absorption of water. They maintain these grassland habitats, and some large herbivores such as bison and pronghorn prefer to graze near prairie dog colonies due to the increased nutritional quality of forage.

Extirpation of prairie dogs can also contribute to regional and local biodiversity loss, increased seed depredation, and the establishment and spread of invasive shrubs. Burrowing rodents may eat the fruiting bodies of fungi and spread spores through their feces, thereby allowing the fungi to disperse and form symbiotic relationships with the roots of plants (which usually cannot thrive without them). As such, these rodents may play a role in maintaining healthy forests.

In many temperate regions, beavers play an essential hydrological role. When building their dams and lodges, beavers alter the paths of streams and rivers and allow for the creation of extensive wetland habitats. One study found that engineering by beavers leads to a 33 percent increase in the number of herbaceous plant species in riparian areas. Another study found that beavers increase wild salmon populations. Meanwhile, some rodents are seen as pests, due to their wide range.

Behavior and life history

Feeding

Most rodents are herbivorous, feeding exclusively on plant material such as seeds, stems, leaves, flowers, and roots. Some are omnivorous and a few are predators. The field vole is a typical herbivorous rodent and feeds on grasses, herbs, root tubers, moss, and other vegetation, and gnaws on bark during the winter. It occasionally eats invertebrates such as insect larvae. The plains pocket gopher eats plant material found underground during tunneling, and also collects grasses, roots, and tubers in its cheek pouches and caches them in underground larder chambers.

The Texas pocket gopher avoids emerging onto the surface to feed by seizing the roots of plants with its jaws and pulling them downwards into its burrow. It also practices coprophagy. The African pouched rat forages on the surface, gathering anything that might be edible into its capacious cheek pouches until its face bulges out sideways. It then returns to its burrow to sort through the material it has gathered and eats the nutritious items.

Agouti species are one of the few animal groups that can break open the large capsules of the Brazil nut fruit. Too many seeds are inside to be consumed in one meal, so the agouti carries some off and caches them. This helps dispersal of the seeds as any that the agouti fails to retrieve are distant from the parent tree when they germinate. Other nut-bearing trees tend to bear a glut of fruits in the autumn. These are too numerous to be eaten in one meal and squirrels gather and store the surplus in crevices and hollow trees. In desert regions, seeds are often available only for short periods. The kangaroo rat collects all it can find and stores them in larder chambers in its burrow.

A strategy for dealing with seasonal plenty is to eat as much as possible and store the surplus nutrients as fat. Marmots do this, and may be 50% heavier in the autumn than in the spring. They rely on their fat reserves during their long winter hibernation. Beavers feed on the leaves, buds, and inner bark of growing trees, as well as aquatic plants. They store food for winter use by felling small trees and leafy branches in the autumn and immersing them in their pond, sticking the ends into the mud to anchor them. Here, they can access their food supply underwater even when their pond is frozen over.

Although rodents have been regarded traditionally as herbivores, most small rodents opportunistically include insects, worms, fungi, fish, or meat in their diets and a few have become specialized to rely on a diet of animal matter. A functional-morphological study of the rodent tooth system supports the idea that primitive rodents were omnivores rather than herbivores. Studies of the literature show that numerous members of the Sciuromorpha and Myomorpha, and a few members of the Hystricomorpha, have either included animal matter in their diets or been prepared to eat such food when offered it in captivity. Examination of the stomach contents of the North American white-footed mouse, normally considered to be herbivorous, showed 34% animal matter.

More specialized carnivores include the shrewlike rats of the Philippines, which feed on insects and soft-bodied invertebrates, and the Australian water rat, which devours aquatic insects, fish, crustaceans, mussels, snails, frogs, birds' eggs, and water birds. The grasshopper mouse from dry regions of North America feeds on insects, scorpions, and other small mice, and only a small part of its diet is plant material. It has a chunky body with short legs and tail, but is agile and can easily overpower prey as large as itself.

Social behavior

Rodents exhibit a wide range of types of social behavior ranging from the mammalian caste system of the naked mole-rat, the extensive "town" of the colonial prairie dog, through family groups to the independent, solitary life of the edible dormouse. Adult dormice may have overlapping feeding ranges, but they live in individual nests and feed separately, coming together briefly in the breeding season to mate. The pocket gopher is also a solitary animal outside the breeding season, each individual digging a complex tunnel system and maintaining a territory.

Larger rodents tend to live in family units where parents and their offspring live together until the young disperse. Beavers live in extended family units typically with a pair of adults, this year's kits, the previous year's offspring, and sometimes older young. Brown rats usually live in small colonies with up to six females sharing a burrow and one male defending a territory around the burrow. At high population densities, this system breaks down and males show a hierarchical system of dominance with overlapping ranges. Female offspring remain in the colony while male young disperse. The prairie vole is monogamous and forms a lifelong pair bond. Outside the breeding season, prairie voles live with others in small colonies. A male is not aggressive towards other males until he has mated, after which time he defends a territory, a female, and a nest against other males. The pair huddles together, grooms one another, and shares nesting and pup-raising responsibilities.

Among the most social of rodents are the ground squirrels, which typically form colonies based on female kinship, with males dispersing after weaning and becoming nomadic as adults. Cooperation in ground squirrels varies between species and typically includes making alarm calls, defending territories, sharing food, protecting nesting areas, and preventing infanticide. The black-tailed prairie dog forms large towns that may cover many hectares. The burrows do not interconnect, but are excavated and occupied by territorial family groups known as coteries. A coterie often consists of an adult male, three or four adult females, several nonbreeding yearlings, and the current year's offspring. Individuals within coteries are friendly with each other, but hostile towards outsiders.

Perhaps the most extreme examples of colonial behavior in rodents are the eusocial naked mole rat and Damaraland mole rat. The naked mole rat lives completely underground and can form colonies of up to 80 individuals. Only one female and up to three males in the colony reproduce, while the rest of the members are smaller and sterile, and function as workers. Some individuals are of intermediate size. They help with the rearing of the young and can take the place of a reproductive if one dies. The Damaraland mole rat is characterized by having a single reproductively active male and female in a colony where the remaining animals are not truly sterile, but become fertile only if they establish a colony of their own.

Communication

Olfactory

Rodents use scent marking in many social contexts including inter- and intra-species communication, the marking of trails and the establishment of territories. Their urine provides genetic information about individuals including the species, the sex and individual identity, and metabolic information on dominance, reproductive status and health. Compounds derived from the major histocompatibility complex (MHC) are bound to several urinary proteins. The odor of a predator depresses scent-marking behavior.

Rodents are able to recognize close relatives by smell and this allows them to show nepotism (preferential behavior toward their kin) and also avoid inbreeding. This kin recognition is by olfactory cues from urine, feces and glandular secretions. The main assessment may involve the MHC, where the degree of relatedness of two individuals is correlated to the MHC genes they have in common. In non-kin communication, where more permanent odor markers are required, as at territorial borders, then non-volatile major urinary proteins (MUPs), which function as pheromone transporters, may also be used. MUPs may also signal individual identity, with each male house mouse (Mus musculus) excreting urine containing about a dozen genetically encoded MUPs.

House mice deposit urine, which contains pheromones, for territorial marking, individual and group recognition, and social organization. Territorial beavers and red squirrels investigate and become familiar with the scents of their neighbors and respond less aggressively to intrusions by them than to those made by non-territorial "floaters" or strangers. This is known as the "dear enemy effect".

Auditory

Many rodent species, particularly those that are diurnal and social, have a wide range of alarm calls that are emitted when they perceive threats. There are both direct and indirect benefits of doing this. A potential predator may stop when it knows it has been detected, or an alarm call can allow conspecifics or related individuals to take evasive action. Several species, for example prairie dogs, have complex anti-predator alarm call systems. These species may have different calls for different predators (e.g. aerial predators or ground-based predators) and each call contains information about the nature of the precise threat. The urgency of the threat is also conveyed by the acoustic properties of the call.

Social rodents have a wider range of vocalizations than do solitary species. Fifteen different call-types have been recognized in adult Kataba mole rats and four in juveniles. Similarly, the common degu, another social, burrowing rodent, exhibits a wide array of communication methods and has an elaborate vocal repertoire comprising fifteen different categories of sound. Ultrasonic calls play a part in social communication between dormice and are used when the individuals are out of sight of each other.

House mice use both audible and ultrasonic calls in a variety of contexts. Audible vocalizations can often be heard during agonistic or aggressive encounters, whereas ultrasound is used in sexual communication and also by pups when they have fallen out of the nest.

Laboratory rats (which are brown rats, Rattus norvegicus) emit short, high frequency, ultrasonic vocalizations during purportedly pleasurable experiences such as rough-and-tumble play, when anticipating routine doses of morphine, during mating, and when tickled. The vocalization, described as a distinct "chirping", has been likened to laughter, and is interpreted as an expectation of something rewarding. In clinical studies, the chirping is associated with positive emotional feelings, and social bonding occurs with the tickler, resulting in the rats becoming conditioned to seek the tickling. However, as the rats age, the tendency to chirp declines. Like most rat vocalizations, the chirping is at frequencies too high for humans to hear without special equipment, so bat detectors have been used for this purpose.

Visual
Rodents, like all placental mammals except primates, have just two types of light receptive cones in their retina, a short wavelength "blue-UV" type and a middle wavelength "green" type. They are therefore classified as dichromats; however, they are visually sensitive into the ultraviolet (UV) spectrum and therefore can see light that humans can not. The functions of this UV sensitivity are not always clear. In degus, for example, the belly reflects more UV light than the back. Therefore, when a degu stands up on its hind legs, which it does when alarmed, it exposes its belly to other degus and ultraviolet vision may serve a purpose in communicating the alarm. When it stands on all fours, its low UV-reflectance back could help make the degu less visible to predators. Ultraviolet light is abundant during the day but not at night. There is a large increase in the ratio of ultraviolet to visible light in the morning and evening twilight hours. Many rodents are active during twilight hours (crepuscular activity), and UV-sensitivity would be advantageous at these times. Ultraviolet reflectivity is of dubious value for nocturnal rodents.

The urine of many rodents (e.g. voles, degus, mice, rats) strongly reflects UV light and this may be used in communication by leaving visible as well as olfactory markings. However, the amount of UV that is reflected decreases with time, which in some circumstances can be disadvantageous; the common kestrel can distinguish between old and fresh rodent trails and has greater success hunting over more recently marked routes.

Tactile

Vibrations can provide cues to conspecifics about specific behaviors being performed, predator warning and avoidance, herd or group maintenance, and courtship. The Middle East blind mole rat was the first mammal for which seismic communication was documented. These fossorial rodents bang their head against the walls of their tunnels. This behavior was initially interpreted as part of their tunnel building behavior, but it was eventually realized that they generate temporally patterned seismic signals for long-distance communication with neighboring mole rats.

Footdrumming is used widely as a predator warning or defensive action. It is used primarily by fossorial or semi-fossorial rodents. The banner-tailed kangaroo rat produces several complex footdrumming patterns in a number of different contexts, one of which is when it encounters a snake. The footdrumming may alert nearby offspring but most likely conveys that the rat is too alert for a successful attack, thus preventing the snake's predatory pursuit. Several studies have indicated intentional use of ground vibrations as a means of intra-specific communication during courtship among the Cape mole rat. Footdrumming has been reported to be involved in male-male competition; the dominant male indicates its resource holding potential by drumming, thus minimizing physical contact with potential rivals.

Mating strategies

Some species of rodent are monogamous, with an adult male and female forming a lasting pair bond. Monogamy can come in two forms; obligate and facultative. In obligate monogamy, both parents care for the offspring and play an important part in their survival. This occurs in species such as California mice, oldfield mice, Malagasy giant rats and beavers. In these species, males usually mate only with their partners. In addition to increased care for young, obligate monogamy can also be beneficial to the adult male as it decreases the chances of never finding a mate or mating with an infertile female. In facultative monogamy, the males do not provide direct parental care and stay with one female because they cannot access others due to being spatially dispersed. Prairie voles appear to be an example of this form of monogamy, with males guarding and defending females within their vicinity.

In polygynous species, males will try to monopolize and mate with multiple females. As with monogamy, polygyny in rodents can come in two forms; defense and non-defense. Defense polygyny involves males controlling territories that contain resources that attract females. This occurs in ground squirrels like yellow-bellied marmots, California ground squirrels, Columbian ground squirrels and Richardson's ground squirrels. Males with territories are known as "resident" males and the females that live within the territories are known as "resident" females. In the case of marmots, resident males do not appear to ever lose their territories and always win encounters with invading males. Some species are also known to directly defend their resident females and the ensuing fights can lead to severe wounding. In species with non-defense polygyny, males are not territorial and wander widely in search of females to monopolize. These males establish dominance hierarchies, with the high-ranking males having access to the most females. This occurs in species like Belding's ground squirrels and some tree squirrel species.

Promiscuity, in which both males and females mate with multiple partners, also occurs in rodents. In species such as the white-footed mouse, females give birth to litters with multiple paternities. Promiscuity leads to increased sperm competition and males tend to have larger testicles. In the Cape ground squirrel, the male's testes can be 20 percent of its head-body length. Several rodent species have flexible mating systems that can vary between monogamy, polygyny and promiscuity.

Female rodents play an active role in choosing their mates. Factors that contribute to female preference may include the size, dominance and spatial ability of the male. In the eusocial naked mole rats, a single female monopolizes mating from at least three males.

In most rodent species, such as brown rats and house mice, ovulation occurs on a regular cycle while in others, such as voles, it is induced by mating. During copulation, males of some rodent species deposit a mating plug in the female's genital opening, both to prevent sperm leakage and to protect against other males inseminating the female. Females can remove the plug and may do so either immediately or after several hours.

Metabolism of thyroid hormones and iodine in the mediobasal hypothalamus changes in response to photoperiod. Thyroid hormones in turn induce reproductive changes. This is found by Watanabe et al. 2004 and 2007, Barrett et al. 2007, Freeman et al. 2007, and Herwig et al. 2009 in Siberian hamsters, Revel et al. 2006 and Yasuo et al. 2007 in Syrian hamsters, Yasuo et al. 2007 and Ross et al. 2011 in rats, and Ono et al. 2008 in mice.

Birth and parenting

Rodents may be born either altricial (blind, hairless and relatively underdeveloped) or precocial (mostly furred, eyes open and fairly developed) depending on the species. The altricial state is typical for squirrels and mice, while the precocial state usually occurs in species like guinea pigs and porcupines. Females with altricial young typically build elaborate nests before they give birth and maintain them until their offspring are weaned. The female gives birth sitting or lying down and the young emerge in the direction she is facing. The newborns first venture out of the nest a few days after they have opened their eyes and initially keep returning regularly. As they get older and more developed, they visit the nest less often and leave permanently when weaned.

In precocial species, the mothers invest little in nest building and some do not build nests at all. The female gives birth standing and the young emerge behind her. Mothers of these species maintain contact with their highly mobile young with maternal contact calls. Though relatively independent and weaned within days, precocial young may continue to nurse and be groomed by their mothers. Rodent litter sizes also vary and females with smaller litters spend more time in the nest than those with larger litters.

Mother rodents provide both direct parental care, such as nursing, grooming, retrieving and huddling, and indirect parenting, such as food caching, nest building and protection to their offspring. In many social species, young may be cared for by individuals other than their parents, a practice known as alloparenting or cooperative breeding. This is known to occur in black-tailed prairie dogs and Belding's ground squirrels, where mothers have communal nests and nurse unrelated young along with their own. There is some question as to whether these mothers can distinguish which young are theirs. In the Patagonian mara, young are also placed in communal warrens, but mothers do not permit youngsters other than their own to nurse.

Infanticide exists in numerous rodent species and may be practiced by adult conspecifics of either sex. Several reasons have been proposed for this behavior, including nutritional stress, resource competition, avoiding misdirecting parental care and, in the case of males, attempting to make the mother sexually receptive. The latter reason is well supported in primates and lions but less so in rodents. Infanticide appears to be widespread in black-tailed prairie dogs, including infanticide from invading males and immigrant females, as well as occasional cannibalism of an individual's own offspring. To protect against infanticide from other adults, female rodents may employ avoidance or direct aggression against potential perpetrators, multiple mating, territoriality or early termination of pregnancy. Feticide can also occur among rodents; in Alpine marmots, dominant females tend to suppress the reproduction of subordinates by being antagonistic towards them while they are pregnant. The resulting stress causes the fetuses to abort.

Intelligence

Rodents have advanced cognitive abilities. They can quickly learn to avoid poisoned baits, which makes them difficult pests to deal with. Guinea pigs can learn and remember complex pathways to food. Squirrels and kangaroo rats are able to locate caches of food by spatial memory, rather than just by smell.

Because laboratory mice (house mice) and rats (brown rats) are widely used as scientific models to further our understanding of biology, a great deal has come to be known about their cognitive capacities. Brown rats exhibit cognitive bias, where information processing is biased by whether they are in a positive or negative affective state. For example, laboratory rats trained to respond to a specific tone by pressing a lever to receive a reward, and to press another lever in response to a different tone so as to avoid receiving an electric shock, are more likely to respond to an intermediate tone by choosing the reward lever if they have just been tickled (something they enjoy), indicating "a link between the directly measured positive affective state and decision making under uncertainty in an animal model."

Laboratory (brown) rats may have the capacity for metacognition—to consider their own learning and then make decisions based on what they know, or do not know, as indicated by choices they make apparently trading off difficulty of tasks and expected rewards, making them the first animals other than primates known to have this capacity, but these findings are disputed, since the rats may have been following simple operant conditioning principles, or a behavioral economic model. Brown rats use social learning in a wide range of situations, but perhaps especially so in acquiring food preferences.

Classification and evolution

Evolutionary history

Dentition is the key feature by which fossil rodents are recognized and the earliest record of such mammals comes from the Paleocene, shortly after the extinction of the non-avian dinosaurs some 66 million years ago. These fossils are found in Laurasia, the supercontinent composed of modern-day North America, Europe, and Asia. The divergence of Glires, a clade consisting of rodents and lagomorphs (rabbits, hares and pikas), from other placental mammals occurred within a few million years after the Cretaceous-Paleogene boundary; rodents and lagomorphs then radiated during the Cenozoic. Some molecular clock data suggest modern rodents (members of the order Rodentia) had appeared by the late Cretaceous, although other molecular divergence estimations are in agreement with the fossil record.

Rodents are thought to have evolved in Asia, where local multituberculate faunas were severely affected by the Cretaceous–Paleogene extinction event and never fully recovered, unlike their North American and European relatives. In the resulting ecological vacuum, rodents and other Glires were able to evolve and diversify, taking the niches left by extinct multituberculates. The correlation between the spread of rodents and the demise of multituberculates is a controversial topic, not fully resolved. American and European multituberculate assemblages do decline in diversity in correlation with the introduction of rodents in these areas, but the remaining Asian multituberculates co-existed with rodents with no observable replacement taking place, and ultimately both clades co-existed for at least 15 million years.

The history of the colonization of the world's continents by rodents is complex. The movements of the large superfamily Muroidea (including hamsters, gerbils, true mice and rats) may have involved up to seven colonizations of Africa, five of North America, four of Southeast Asia, two of South America and up to ten of Eurasia.

During the Eocene, rodents began to diversify. Beavers appeared in Eurasia in the late Eocene before spreading to North America in the late Miocene. Late in the Eocene, hystricognaths invaded Africa, most probably having originated in Asia at least 39.5 million years ago. From Africa, fossil evidence shows that some hystricognaths (caviomorphs) colonized South America, which was an isolated continent at the time, evidently making use of ocean currents to cross the Atlantic on floating debris. Caviomorphs had arrived in South America by 41 million years ago (implying a date at least as early as this for hystricognaths in Africa), and had reached the Greater Antilles by the early Oligocene, suggesting that they must have dispersed rapidly across South America.

Nesomyid rodents are thought to have rafted from Africa to Madagascar 20–24 million years ago. All 27 species of native Malagasy rodents appear to be descendants of a single colonization event.

By 20 million years ago, fossils recognizably belonging to the current families such as Muridae had emerged. By the Miocene, when Africa had collided with Asia, African rodents such as the porcupine began to spread into Eurasia. The largest known rodent was Josephoartigasia monesi, a pacarana with an estimated body length of 3 m (10 ft).

The first rodents arrived in Australia via Indonesia around 5 million years ago. Although marsupials are the most prominent mammals in Australia, many rodents, all belonging to the subfamily Murinae, are among the continent's mammal species. There are about fifty species of 'old endemics', the first wave of rodents to colonize the country in the Miocene and early Pliocene, and eight true rat (Rattus) species of 'new endemics', arriving in a subsequent wave in the late Pliocene or early Pleistocene. The earliest fossil rodents in Australia have a maximum age of 4.5 million years, and molecular data is consistent with the colonization of New Guinea from the west during the late Miocene or early Pliocene followed by rapid diversification. A further wave of adaptive radiation occurred after one or more colonizations of Australia some 2 to 3 million years later.

Rodents participated in the Great American Interchange that resulted from the joining of the Americas by formation of the Isthmus of Panama, around 3 million years ago in the Piacenzian age. In this exchange, a small number of species such as the New World porcupines (Erethizontidae) headed north. However, the main southward invasion of sigmodontines preceded formation of the land bridge by at least several million years, probably occurring via rafting. Sigmodontines diversified explosively once in South America, although some degree of diversification may have already occurred in Central America before the colonization.

Standard classification 
The use of the order name "Rodentia" is attributed to the English traveler and naturalist Thomas Edward Bowdich (1821). The hares, rabbits and pikas (order Lagomorpha) have continuously growing incisors, as do rodents, and were at one time included in the order. However, they have an additional pair of incisors in the upper jaw and the two orders have quite separate evolutionary histories. The phylogeny of the rodents places them in the clades Glires, Euarchontoglires and Boreoeutheria. The cladogram below shows the inner and outer relations of Rodentia based on a 2012 attempt by Wu et al. to align the molecular clock with paleontological data:
 

The living rodent families based on the study done by Fabre et al. 2012.

The order Rodentia may be divided into suborders, infraorders, superfamilies and families. There is a great deal of parallelism and convergence among rodents caused by the fact that they have tended to evolve to fill largely similar niches. This parallel evolution includes not only the structure of the teeth, but also the infraorbital region of the skull (below the eye socket) and makes classification difficult as similar traits may not be due to common ancestry. Brandt (1855) was the first to propose dividing Rodentia into three suborders, Sciuromorpha, Hystricomorpha and Myomorpha, based on the development of certain muscles in the jaw and this system was widely accepted. Schlosser (1884) performed a comprehensive review of rodent fossils, mainly using the cheek teeth, and found that they fitted into the classical system, but Tullborg (1899) proposed just two sub-orders, Sciurognathi and Hystricognathi. These were based on the degree of inflection of the lower jaw and were to be further subdivided into Sciuromorpha, Myomorpha, Hystricomorpha and Bathyergomorpha. Matthew (1910) created a phylogenetic tree of New World rodents but did not include the more problematic Old World species. Further attempts at classification continued without agreement, with some authors adopting the classical three suborder system and others Tullborg's two suborders.

These disagreements remain unresolved, nor have molecular studies fully resolved the situation though they have confirmed the monophyly of the group and that the clade has descended from a common Paleocene ancestor. Carleton and Musser (2005) in Mammal Species of the World have provisionally adopted a five suborder system: Sciuromorpha, Castorimorpha, Myomorpha, Anomaluromorpha, and Hystricomorpha. As of 2021 the American Society of Mammalogists recognizes 34 recent families containing more than 481 genera and 2277 species. 

Order Rodentia (from Latin, rodere, to gnaw)

Suborder Anomaluromorpha
Family Anomaluridae: scaly-tailed squirrels
Family Pedetidae: springhares
Family Zenkerellidae: Cameroon scaly-tail
Suborder Castorimorpha
Superfamily Castoroidea
 Family Castoridae: beavers
Superfamily Geomyoidea
Family Geomyidae: pocket gophers (true gophers)
Family Heteromyidae: kangaroo rats, kangaroo mice
Suborder Hystricomorpha
Infraorder Ctenodactylomorphi
Family Ctenodactylidae: gundis
Family Diatomyidae: Laotian rock rat
Infraorder Hystricognathi
Parvorder Phiomorpha
Family Bathyergidae: African mole rats
Family Heterocephalidae: naked mole-rat
Family Hystricidae: Old World porcupines
Family Petromuridae: dassie rat
Family Thryonomyidae: cane rats
Parvorder Caviomorpha
Superfamily Erethizontoidea
Family Erethizontidae: New World porcupines
Superfamily Chinchilloidea
Family Chinchillidae: chinchillas, viscachas
Family Dinomyidae: pacaranas
Superfamily Cavioidea
Family Caviidae: cavies, including Guinea pigs and the capybara
Family Dasyproctidae: agoutis
Family Cuniculidae: pacas
Superfamily Octodontoidea
Family Abrocomidae: chinchilla rats
Family Ctenomyidae: tuco-tucos
Family Echimyidae: spiny rats, hutias, and coypu
Family Octodontidae: octodonts
Suborder Myomorpha
Superfamily Dipodoidea
Family Dipodidae: jerboas 
Family Sminthidae: birch mice
Family Zapodidae: jumping mice
Superfamily Muroidea
Family Calomyscidae: mouse-like hamsters
Family Cricetidae: hamsters, New World rats and mice, muskrats, voles, lemmings
Family Muridae: true mice and rats, gerbils, spiny mice, crested rat
Family Nesomyidae: climbing mice, rock mice, white-tailed rat, Malagasy rats and mice
Family Platacanthomyidae: spiny dormice
Family Spalacidae: mole rats, bamboo rats, zokors
Suborder Sciuromorpha
Family Aplodontiidae: mountain beaver
Family Gliridae (also Myoxidae, Muscardinidae): dormice
Family Sciuridae: squirrels, including chipmunks, prairie dogs, marmots

Interaction with humans

Conservation 

While rodents are not the most seriously threatened order of mammals, there are 168 species in 126 genera that are said to warrant conservation attention in the face of limited appreciation by the public. Since 76 percent of rodent genera contain only one species, much phylogenetic diversity could be lost with a comparatively small number of extinctions. In the absence of more detailed knowledge of species at risk and accurate taxonomy, conservation must be based mainly on higher taxa (such as families rather than species) and geographical hot spots. Several species of rice rat have become extinct since the 19th century, probably through habitat loss and the introduction of alien species. In Colombia, the brown hairy dwarf porcupine was recorded from only two mountain localities in the 1920s, while the red crested soft-furred spiny rat is known only from its type locality on the Caribbean coast, so these species are considered vulnerable. The IUCN Species Survival Commission writes "We can safely conclude that many South American rodents are seriously threatened, mainly by environmental disturbance and intensive hunting".

The "three now cosmopolitan commensal rodent pest species" (the brown rat, the black rat and the house mouse) have been dispersed in association with humans, partly on sailing ships in the Age of Exploration, and with a fourth species in the Pacific, the Polynesian rat (Rattus exulans), have severely damaged island biotas around the world. For example, when the black rat reached Lord Howe Island in 1918, over 40 percent of the terrestrial bird species of the island, including the Lord Howe fantail, became extinct within ten years. Similar destruction has been seen on Midway Island (1943) and Big South Cape Island (1962). Conservation projects can with careful planning completely eradicate these pest rodents from islands using an anticoagulant rodenticide such as brodifacoum. This approach has been successful on the island of Lundy in the United Kingdom, where the eradication of an estimated 40,000 brown rats is giving populations of Manx shearwater and Atlantic puffin a chance to recover from near-extinction.

Rodents have also been susceptible to climate change, especially species living on low-lying islands. The Bramble Cay melomys, which lived in the northernmost point of land of Australia, was the first mammal species to be declared extinct as a consequence of human-caused climate change.

Exploitation 

Humanity has long used animal skins for clothing, as the leather is durable and the fur provides extra insulation. The native people of North America made much use of beaver pelts, tanning and sewing them together to make robes. Europeans appreciated the quality of these and the North American fur trade developed and became of prime importance to early settlers. In Europe, the soft underfur known as "beaver wool" was found to be ideal for felting and was made into beaver hats and trimming for clothing. Later, the coypu took over as a cheaper source of fur for felting and was farmed extensively in America and Europe; however, fashions changed, new materials became available and this area of the animal fur industry declined. The chinchilla has a soft and silky coat and the demand for its fur was so high that it was nearly wiped out in the wild before farming took over as the main source of pelts. The quills and guardhairs of porcupines are used for traditional decorative clothing. For example, their guardhairs are used in the creation of the Native American "porky roach" headdress. The main quills may be dyed, and then applied in combination with thread to embellish leather accessories such as knife sheaths and leather bags. Lakota women would harvest the quills for quillwork by throwing a blanket over a porcupine and retrieving the quills it left stuck in the blanket.

Consumption 
At least 89 species of rodent, mostly Hystricomorpha such as guinea pigs, agoutis and capybaras, are eaten by humans; in 1985, there were at least 42 different societies in which people eat rats. Guinea pigs were first raised for food around 2500 B.C. and by 1500 B.C. had become the main source of meat for the Inca Empire. Dormice were raised by the Romans in special pots called "gliraria", or in large outdoor enclosures, where they were fattened on walnuts, chestnuts, and acorns. The dormice were also caught from the wild in autumn when they were fattest, and either roasted and dipped into honey or baked while stuffed with a mixture of pork, pine nuts, and other flavorings. Researchers found that in Amazonia, where large mammals were scarce, pacas and common agoutis accounted for around 40 percent of the annual game taken by the indigenous people, but in forested areas where larger mammals were abundant, these rodents constituted only about 3 percent of the take.

Guinea pigs are used in the cuisine of Cuzco, Peru, in dishes such as cuy al horno, baked guinea pig. The traditional Andean stove, known as a qoncha or a fogón, is made from mud and clay reinforced with straw and hair from animals such as guinea pigs. In Peru, there are at any time 20 million domestic guinea pigs, which annually produce 64 million edible carcasses. This animal is an excellent food source since the flesh is 19% protein. In the United States, mostly squirrels, but also muskrats, porcupines, and groundhogs are eaten by humans. The Navajo people ate prairie dog baked in mud, while the Paiute ate gophers, squirrels, and rats.

Animal testing 

Rodents are used widely as model organisms in animal testing. Albino mutant rats were first used for research in 1828 and later became the first animal domesticated for purely scientific purposes. Nowadays, the house mouse is the most commonly used laboratory rodent, and in 1979 it was estimated that fifty million were used annually worldwide. They are favored because of their small size, fertility, short gestation period and ease of handling and because they are susceptible to many of the conditions and infections that afflict humans. They are used in research into genetics, developmental biology, cell biology, oncology and immunology. Guinea pigs were popular laboratory animals until the late 20th century; about 2.5 million guinea pigs were used annually in the United States for research in the 1960s, but that total decreased to about 375,000 by the mid-1990s. In 2007, they constituted about 2% of all laboratory animals. Guinea pigs played a major role in the establishment of germ theory in the late 19th century, through the experiments of Louis Pasteur, Émile Roux, and Robert Koch. They have been launched into orbital space flight several times—first by the USSR on the Sputnik 9 biosatellite of 9 March 1961, with a successful recovery. The naked mole rat is the only known mammal that is poikilothermic; it is used in studies on thermoregulation. It is also unusual in not producing the neurotransmitter substance P, a fact which researchers find useful in studies on pain.

Rodents have sensitive olfactory abilities, which have been used by humans to detect odors or chemicals of interest. The Gambian pouched rat is able to detect tuberculosis bacilli with a sensitivity of up to 86.6%, and specificity (detecting the absence of the bacilli) of over 93%; the same species has been trained to detect land mines. Rats have been studied for possible use in hazardous situations such as in disaster zones. They can be trained to respond to commands, which may be given remotely, and even persuaded to venture into brightly lit areas, which rats usually avoid.

As pets 

Rodents including guinea pigs, mice, rats, hamsters, gerbils, chinchillas, degus and chipmunks make convenient pets able to live in small spaces, each species with its own qualities. Most are normally kept in cages of suitable sizes and have varied requirements for space and social interaction. If handled from a young age, they are usually docile and do not bite. Guinea pigs have a long lifespan and need a large cage. Rats also need plenty of space and can become very tame, can learn tricks and seem to enjoy human companionship. Mice are short-lived but take up very little space. Hamsters are solitary but tend to be nocturnal. They have interesting behaviors, but unless handled regularly they may be defensive. Gerbils are not usually aggressive, rarely bite and are sociable animals that enjoy the company of humans and their own kind.

As pests and disease vectors 

Some rodent species are serious agricultural pests, eating large quantities of food stored by humans. For example, in 2003, the amount of rice lost to mice and rats in Asia was estimated to be enough to feed 200 million people. Most of the damage worldwide is caused by a relatively small number of species, chiefly rats and mice. In Indonesia and Tanzania, rodents reduce crop yields by around fifteen percent, while in some instances in South America losses have reached ninety percent. Across Africa, rodents including Mastomys and Arvicanthis damage cereals, groundnuts, vegetables and cacao. In Asia, rats, mice and species such as Microtus brandti, Meriones unguiculatus and Eospalax baileyi damage crops of rice, sorghum, tubers, vegetables and nuts. In Europe, as well as rats and mice, species of Apodemus, Microtus and in occasional outbreaks Arvicola terrestris cause damage to orchards, vegetables and pasture as well as cereals. In South America, a wider range of rodent species, such as Holochilus, Akodon, Calomys, Oligoryzomys, Phyllotis, Sigmodon and Zygodontomys, damage many crops including sugar cane, fruits, vegetables, and tubers.

Rodents are also significant vectors of disease. The black rat, with the fleas that it carries, plays a primary role in spreading the bacterium Yersinia pestis responsible for bubonic plague, and carries the organisms responsible for typhus, Weil's disease, toxoplasmosis and trichinosis. A number of rodents carry hantaviruses, including the Puumala, Dobrava and Saaremaa viruses, which can infect humans. Rodents also help to transmit diseases including babesiosis, cutaneous leishmaniasis, human granulocytic anaplasmosis, Lyme disease, Omsk hemorrhagic fever, Powassan virus, rickettsialpox, relapsing fever, Rocky Mountain spotted fever, and West Nile virus.

Because rodents are a nuisance and endanger public health, human societies often attempt to control them. Traditionally, this involved poisoning and trapping, methods that were not always safe or effective. More recently, integrated pest management attempts to improve control with a combination of surveys to determine the size and distribution of the pest population, the establishment of tolerance limits (levels of pest activity at which to intervene), interventions, and evaluation of effectiveness based on repeated surveys. Interventions may include education, making and applying laws and regulations, modifying the habitat, changing farming practices, and biological control using pathogens or predators, as well as poisoning and trapping. The use of pathogens such as Salmonella has the drawback that they can infect man and domestic animals, and rodents often become resistant. The use of predators including ferrets, mongooses and monitor lizards has been found unsatisfactory. Domestic and feral cats are able to control rodents effectively, provided the rodent population is not too large. In the UK, two species in particular, the house mouse and the brown rat, are actively controlled to limit damage in growing crops, loss and contamination of stored crops and structural damage to facilities, as well as to comply with the law.

See also
 Fe, Fi, Fo, Fum, and Phooey, mice who orbited the Moon on Apollo 17
 Mouse models of breast cancer metastasis

References

Further reading 
 
 
 Carleton, M. D.; Musser, G. G. "Order Rodentia", pages 745–752 in Wilson & Reeder (2005).

External links

Zoology, osteology, comparative anatomy 
 ArchéoZooThèque : Rodent osteology  (photos)
 ArchéoZooThèque : Rodent skeleton drawings

Various 
 African rodentia
 Rodent photos on Flickr
 Rodent Species Fact Sheets from the National Pest Management Association on Deer Mice, Norway Rats, and other rodent species

 
Articles containing video clips
Extant Thanetian first appearances
Taxa named by Thomas Edward Bowdich